Mark Dunn (born July 12, 1956, in Memphis, Tennessee) is an American author and playwright. He studied film at Memphis State University (now the University of Memphis) followed by post-graduate work in screenwriting at the University of Texas at Austin moving to New York in 1987 where he worked in the New York Public Library whilst writing plays in his free time.

Among the thirty plays Dunn has written (as of 2015), Belles and Five Tellers Dancing in the Rain have been produced over one hundred and fifty times. Dunn is playwright-in-residence with the New Jersey Repertory Company and the Community Theatre League in Williamsport, Pennsylvania. 

In 1998 Dunn sued the writers, distributors and producers of The Truman Show, claiming that the story was based on a play he had written and performed Off-Broadway in 1992, Frank's Life.

Personal life

Dunn lives with his wife Mary in Santa Fe, New Mexico.

Published full-length plays

Belles (1989)
Minus Some Buttons (1991)
Sand Pies and Scissorlegs (1992)
Five Tellers Dancing in the Rain (1994)
Judge and Jury (1994)
Frank's Life (1998)
Cabin Fever: A Texas Tragicomedy (2000)
The Deer and the Antelope Play (2001)
Helen's Most Favorite Day (2005)
Dix Tableaux (2007)
A Delightful Quarantine (2007)
PIGmalion (2010)
Seven Interviews (2014)

Novels
Ella Minnow Pea (2001)
Welcome to Higby (2002)
Ibid: A Life (2004)
The Calamitous Adventures of Rodney And Wayne (2009)
Under the Harrow (2010)
American Decameron (2012)
We Five (2015).

References

External links
 2002 interview
 Random House interview
 Ella Minnow Pea interview

20th-century American dramatists and playwrights
21st-century American novelists
1956 births
Living people
Writers from Memphis, Tennessee
University of Memphis alumni
Moody College of Communication alumni
Writers from Albuquerque, New Mexico
American male novelists
American male dramatists and playwrights
20th-century American male writers
21st-century American male writers
Novelists from Tennessee